Pagalil Pournami is a 1990 Indian Tamil-language horror film directed by V. M. C. Haneefa. The film stars Sivakumar, Raadhika, Rahman (credited as Raghu) and Lissy. It was released on 11 May 1990.

Plot

Cast 
 Sivakumar as DSP Rajasekar
 Raadhika as Rajasekar's wife
 Raghu as Rajasekar's brother
 Raghuvaran as the Hindu saint
 Lissy as Jaya
 S. S. Chandran as Jaya's father
 Nassar as a mental patient
 Somayajulu as a monk
 Kovai Sarala as Jaya's mother
 Baby Sangita as Manju/Ghost
 V. M. C. Haneefa as the hotel manager

Soundtrack 
The soundtrack was composed by Ilaiyaraaja, and the lyrics were written by Vaali.

Release and reception 
Pagalil Pournami was released on 11 May 1990. N. Krishnaswamy of The Indian Express wrote, "From family melodrama to murder thriller to a horror line about spirits of dead persons hungering for revenge, Pagalil Pournami traverses a range of story scenarios haphazardly. While this is diverting, the additional fact that the denouement (the word of French origin) means untying the knots, only reveals that the filmmakers have tied themselves up into knots that they cannot unravel." P. S. S. of Kalki wrote that according to the story, the full moon did not come during the day; the picture has become full moon during the day.

References

External links 
 

1990 films
1990 horror films
1990s Tamil-language films
Films directed by Cochin Haneefa
Films scored by Ilaiyaraaja
Indian horror films